Afrixalus quadrivittatus is a species of frogs in the family Hyperoliidae. It is native to central Africa, Republic of Congo, Democratic Republic of Congo, Gabon where it is widely distributed and abundant.

Its natural habitats include moist and dry savanna. It lays its eggs on leaves above pools, and the tadpoles drop into the water when they emerge.

References

quadrivittatus
Frogs of Africa
Amphibians described in 1908
Taxa named by Franz Werner
Taxonomy articles created by Polbot